Thai Parliament Television is Thai television channel that broadcasts the session of National Assembly of Thailand such as House of Representatives and Senate  and information of parliamentary to people. Outside the parliamentary coverage including non-sitting hours, TPTV air Educational and Edutainment program.

TPTV also shares airtime on NBT since 2002-2003 on Weekday Mornings and Selected Sessions of the Parliament. TPTV also simulcast on most television channels and News Website and social media owned by news media in Thailand during most important sessions.

TPTV was launched on 12 August 2006 in satellite platform. TPTV started broadcasting in Digital television on MCOT MUX on 21 July 2015.

Programming

News and Public Affairs 
 Parliament Newsroom
 Inside The Parliament (Simulcast on NBT)
 People's Parliament (Simulcast on NBT)
 Hotline Parliament
 Zoom In

PBS Kids 

 Clifford The Big Red Dog (upcoming)
 Hero Elementary  (upcoming)

External links

Television stations in Thailand
Legislature broadcasters
2006 establishments in Thailand
Television channels and stations established in 2006